Mark Drennan is a former Republican member of the West Virginia Senate representing the 4th district. Brennan was appointed by Governor Jim Justice to fill the seat previously held by Mike Hall, taking office on September 11, 2017. He lost renomination in 2018 to Eric Tarr.

Early life 
Mark Drennan was born February 29, 1972, in Charleston to Emmett G. Drennan (1943-1997) and Patricia Thomas Drennan (1944-2011). He has one brother, Eric Drennan (1975-).

Marriage and children 
In 2006, Mark married Sarah Nicolls Drennan and the two have sons Alec (2008-) and Connor (2011-).

References

1972 births
Living people
People from Hurricane, West Virginia
Politicians from Charleston, West Virginia
Republican Party West Virginia state senators
21st-century American psychologists
West Virginia State University alumni
West Virginia University alumni
21st-century American politicians
People from Putnam County, West Virginia